Jessica Straus is an American voice actress who works in animation, video games and anime. She has provided voices for several video games, most notably as Juri in Super Street Fighter IV, Pi in .hack//GU//Rebirth and Hiroko Hagakure from Danganronpa Another Episode: Ultra Despair Girls. Additionally, in anime, Jessica is also known as the voice of Taruto from Magical Meow Meow Taruto, Blue from Wolf's Rain, Junko Miyaji from FLCL, Deunan Knute from the Appleseed movie, Mokaku from the Battle Vixens series and Gidget from Eureka Seven.

Filmography

Anime

Film

Video games

Notes

References

 Interview with Jessica Straus on Koei Warriors UK

External links
 
 
 
 Jessica Straus at Crystal Acids English Voice Actor & Production Staff Database
 

American voice actresses
American video game actresses
Living people
Actresses from Los Angeles
20th-century American actresses
21st-century American actresses
Year of birth missing (living people)